The Battle of Toulouse (721) was a victory of an Aquitanian Christian army led by Odo the Great, Duke of Aquitaine over an Umayyad Muslim army besieging the city of Toulouse, led by al-Samh ibn Malik al-Khawlani, the Umayyad wāli (governor-general) of al-Andalus. The decisive Aquitanian victory checked the spread of Umayyad control westward from Narbonne into Aquitaine.

Battle
Al-Samh ibn Malik al-Khawlani, the Umayyad wāli (governor-general) of al-Andalus, built up an army of Arabs and Berbers from Umayyad territories in order to conquer Aquitaine, a large duchy in the southwest of modern-day France, formally under Frankish sovereignty, but in practice almost independent in the hands of the Duke of Aquitaine. British archaeologist Ian Meadows states that al-Samh's aim was to take the Garonne River valley, capture the city of Toulouse, and open up a vast territory stretching all the way to the Atlantic Sea and back south through Muslim-ruled Iberia to the Mediterranean Sea and North Africa.

Al-Samh's army included siege engines, infantry, a few horsemen and a number of mercenaries, as well as Basque slingers. He besieged the city of Toulouse, then Aquitaine's most important city. Duke Odo the Great, otherwise known as Eudes, was not in the city when it was besieged, having left to find help. He asked assistance from the Carolingian king Charles Martel, who in turn preferred to wait and see rather than help his southern rival.

Odo returned three months later with Aquitanian, Gascon, and Frankish troops, and just as the city was about to surrender, attacked the Umayyad invasion force on June 9. The exact origin of the Frankish troops is not certain, but they may have hailed from southern Aquitanian areas, e.g., in the Lower Rhone, where naturalized Franks had settled down decades or centuries before. After Odo originally fled, the Umayyads became overconfident, and instead of maintaining strong outer defenses around their siege camp, and continuously scouting, did neither. Thus, when Odo returned, he was able to launch an assault on the siege force, both from behind and from forces within the walls. The surprised Umayyads scattered with the first attack. Odo's forces cut down those that were resting or fled without weapons or armour.

Al-Samh ibn Malik al-Khawlani managed to get away with a fraction of his forces, but died shortly thereafter, leaving Anbasa ibn Suhaym Al-Kalbi (721–725) as governor. The number of soldiers who engaged in the battle has been grossly inflated to about 300,000 on Odo's side (Al-Maqqari), and a death-toll of 375,000 on the assaulting Umayyad troops. The figures give a rough idea of the scale of the confrontation. In a letter to Pope Gregory II, Odo said he had killed 375,000 Saracens in one day and lost 1,500 of his men.

A miracle is associated with the battle according to the Liber Pontificalis: Pope Gregory II had sent Odo "three blessed sponges/baskets of bread" in 720, which the Duke kept until just before the engagement. He distributed small portions of these to be eaten by his troops at Toulouse, and after the battle, it was reported that no one who had eaten the bread had been killed or wounded.

Aftermath
Arab historians agree that the Battle of Toulouse was a total disaster for the Arabs. After the defeat, some Umayyad officials and soldiers managed to escape, among them Abdul Rahman Al Ghafiqi. However, the clash halted indefinitely the Umayyad expansion northwards. Al-Andalus was at the time re-organising into a new post-Gothic order. The Umayyads kept the military initiative raiding several times the south of Gaul (up to Autun in 725), but avoided new serious campaigns into the north-west.

Odo's victory earned him widespread renown in Aquitaine and recognition abroad. He was hailed as champion of Christianity by the Pope in Rome, and was presented with gifts. Charles steered clear of the political and military developments in the south of Gaul for another 10 years, until 732.

Some authors have called the fateful engagement the Balat Al Shuhada of Toulouse; others attach that name exclusively to the Battle of Poitiers (Tours). According to Meadows, it would be still remembered in memorials by Al-Andalus Muslims for the following 450 years, as opposed to the Battle of Poitiers, held as a battle smaller in scale.

Discussion
Some historians believe that the Battle of Toulouse halted the Muslim conquest of Europe even more than the later—and more celebrated—Battle of Tours (10 October 732, between Tours and Poitiers), but this is highly problematic: for even had the Arabs won at Toulouse, they still would have had to conquer the Franks to retain control of the region. However, nearly all historians agree that the Christian victory at Toulouse was important in a macrohistorical sense in that it gave Charles Martel badly needed time to strengthen his grip on power and build the veteran army which stood him in such good stead eleven years later at Tours. The eleven years between Toulouse and Tours without question gave him time to fully secure power, inspire the loyalty of his troops, and, most importantly, drill the core of veterans who stood so stoutly in 732.

While Odo faded into history after his defeat at Bordeaux, the Battle of Toulouse is important as it bought time for Martel to prepare for the invasion mounted by Abd al Rahman in 732. However, others (e.g. Archibald Lewis, Roger Collins, etc.) hold that Umayyad attacks were raids or razzias, like the one reaching as far north as Autun in 725, and not real attempts to conquer Francia. While Odo is forgotten, Martel was hailed in later times as the "savior of Europe" by many Western and European authors and academic figures.

Citations

Bibliography

Further reading
 Gibbon, Edward. Decline and Fall of the Roman Empire
 Hooker, Richard. "Civil War and the Umayyads"
 Martin, Robert W. "The Battle of Tours is still felt today", from about.com
 Santosuosso, Anthony, Barbarians, Marauders, and Infidels 
 Tours,Poiters, from "Leaders and Battles Database" online.
 Watson, William E., "The Battle of Tours-Poitiers Revisited", Providence: Studies in Western Civilization, 2 (1993)

Toulouse 721
Toulouse 721
Toulouse 721
Toulouse
Islam in France
History of Toulouse
721
8th century in Francia
720s in the Umayyad Caliphate